The 1919–20 British Home Championship was an international football tournament played during the 1919–20 season between the British Home Nations. Wales eventually took the title as the first of three victories they claimed during the 1920s, their last undisputed triumphs. The competition marked an important watershed in British football as part of the first full season played following the First World War, which had killed, wounded or retired many prominent players of the 1914 competition.

In the first British game after the war in October 1919, England and Ireland drew at Windsor Park, Wales and Scotland doing likewise at their first game in February 1920, shortly after Wales and Ireland had drawn in Belfast. Scotland and Wales then exerted the dominance they would display in the ensuing decade, Scotland beating Ireland 3–0 as Wales defeated England 2–1 away. In the final game, Wales relied on England to beat Scotland in order for them to win the championship, a result which came only at the end of an exhausting encounter which finished 5–4.

Table

Results

Winning squad

References

British
British Home Championships
Home Championships
Home Championships
Home Championships
Home Championships
Home Championships
Home Championships